MTV Resistiré is a reality competition broadcast by MTV Latin America. It is an adaptation of Resistiré (Chilean TV series)

It follows the same premise, the contest consists of bringing together a group of people, who will have to survive extreme situations, full of unbearable challenges, in addition to going hungry and overcoming the possible temptations that this implies, to win the final prize. In addition, the participants will compete every week so as not to be eliminated.

Format 
In Resistiré, the 16 participants will be abandoned in a shelter in the middle of nowhere with no beds, indoor toilets, prepared food or a supply of drinking water, but with half a million dollars corresponding to the final prize. With that money they will be able to buy the items they need to survive, but at an unusual value, and in a decision that requires a majority agreement to materialize. Survival, democracy and social struggle: all in one.

Production 
The production of the program began in February 2022, happening to be produced only by MTV and not by MEGA like last season. On February 22, MTV announced the premiere date and the participants. It premiered on March 21, 2022, and broadcast its last episode on April 20 of the same year.

Contestants

Nominations table 
 Votes of the "Careo": Participants vote for a member of any team (except for the leaders and the first two nominees), whoever gets the most votes will become the third nominee. 
 In the Final, each participant votes individually and whoever obtains the most votes will be "blocked", that is, they will not be able to compete that week for a place in the final.
 Betrayed: Before "The Fight For Supremacy" each captain must choose one of his companions to betray them. The losing team will see their betrayed become the first betrayed.

Summary statistics

References

Reality competition television series